Barmby may refer to:

People:
Catherine Barmby (1816/17 – 1853), utopian socialist and writer on women's emancipation
Francis Barmby (1863–1936), English cricketer
Jack Barmby (born 1994), English professional footballer
Jeff Barmby (1943–2021), English footballer
John Goodwyn Barmby (1820–1881), British Victorian utopian socialist
Nick Barmby (born 1974), English professional footballer, former manager of Football League Championship club Hull City

Geography:
Barmby on the Marsh, village and civil parish in the East Riding of Yorkshire, England
Barmby Moor, village and civil parish in the East Riding of Yorkshire, England
Barmby railway station, station on the Hull and Barnsley Railway, serving Barmby on the Marsh

See also
Barby (disambiguation)
Barmy